The sports club Anka Spor Kulübü (Anka SK) is a professional men's and women's, young and PW ice hockey teams from Ankara, Turkey. The men participate in the Turkish Hockey SuperLig (TBHSL) and the women in the Turkish Ice Hockey Women's League, Turkish Young's Ice Hockey League and Turkish PW Ice Hockey Tournament. The teams play in the Ankara Ice Palace. The club's colors are fire red and night blue.

History
The men's team finished the league as following:

Men's team

Men’s roster 2010-2011

Former foreign players

Women's team

Women’s roster

References

Ice hockey teams in Turkey
Turkish Ice Hockey Super League teams
Sports teams in Ankara
Ice hockey clubs established in 2004
2004 establishments in Turkey